Wath may refer to:

Places in England
 Wath, Cumbria, a U.K. location
 Wath (near Ripon), a village in Harrogate district, North Yorkshire
 Wath, Ryedale, a village in North Yorkshire
 Wath-in-Nidderdale, a village near Pateley Bridge in Harrogate district, North Yorkshire
 Wath upon Dearne, a town in South Yorkshire

Other uses
 WATH, radio station in Ohio
 Wath Academy, Wath-upon-Dearne, South Yorkshire, England

See also
 Wath railway station (disambiguation)
 Van der Wath, a surname